Weobley is an ancient settlement and civil parish in Herefordshire, England. 
Formerly a market town, the market is long defunct and the settlement is today promoted as one of the county's black and white villages owing to its abundance of old timber-framed buildings. Although it has the historical status of a town and is referred to as such in the sources, it nowadays refers to itself as a village.

Topography

Landscape
It occupies the small shallow valley of the little Marl Brook in the northern lower dip slope of Burton Hill, overlooking the valley of the Newbridge Brook which is a sub-tributary of the River Arrow.
The surrounding countryside is mostly farmland, with a few small named ancient woods. However, to the south the deer park of Garnstone Castle (formerly Garnstone Manor) separates the settlement from the wooded heights of Burton Hill. The “castle” was a castellated mansion, an important design by John Nash 1807, which was demolished in 1959. Ornamental plantings for it survive, notably a row of Sequoiadendron giganteum trees which includes a monumental specimen of  girth.

Weobley Marsh is a separate hamlet to the east, grouped around an area of ancient common land and traditionally a haunt of witches.

To the west is the ancient farmstead of The Ley, with a Grade-I listed farmhouse dating to 1589.

The underlying geology comprises the Raglan Mudstone Formation of the Lower Old Red Sandstone. The soils are argillic brown earths, of high fertility.

Layout

The historical layout of the settlement, on which the majority of the old buildings stand, is in the form of an inverted T. The crossbar of the T is the High Street, and the stem is the funnel-shaped mediaeval marketplace comprising a triangular area abutting the High Street and extended to the north by the aptly-named Broad Street. The triangle used to have a row of infill buildings, but these were demolished in the mid 20th century and replaced by a small urban park called the Rose Garden. The west side of the former marketplace is called Portland Street, and the south side is Market Pitch.

To the south of the High Street is the site of a mediaeval castle, but this has no civic presence. It abuts the Garnstone deer-park, and is described as a ring and bailey. The track leading to it from the High Street is flanked by an avenue of oaks planted in 1837 to mark the accession of Queen Victoria.

From towards the east end of the High Street, and running to the east of the castle, is the Hereford Road. This was originally a turnpike road to Hereford, but is now just a country lane.

At the north end of Broad Street, Bell Square runs to the west with more old buildings, then turns to the north-west as Meadow Street (B4230) to become the road to Kington. Bell Square is very wide for a street, and has been suggested as the core of the pre-13th century village arranged around an early marketplace or small village green.

The west end of the High Street turns south then west as Mill Bank, named after an impressive mid 19th century brick corn mill but formerly known as Chamber Walk, and this becomes the B4230 road to Hereford. The mill is Grade II listed.

The ancient parish church of SS Peter and Paul is oddly placed, away from the built-up area to the north and accessed by a country lane called Church Road which is a continuation of Broad Street. More unusually, this lane doubles back on itself after running round the churchyard and ends a short distance west of where it started, forming a dead-end hairpin loop. This has been suggested as the ghost of the pre-13th century village, arranged between the church and an early marketplace or small village green at Bell Square. A small grassy area is due south of the churchyard, and this used to be the town's bowling green.

The B4230 does not enter the old town centre, but runs directly from Mill Bank to Meadow Street via a little bypass called Back Lane which roughly parallels Broad Street to the west. This is an old thoroughfare; the name in other mediaeval boroughs is known to indicate an access route to the back ends of a set of thin land strips called burgage tenements. One of these would comprise a town house with a smallholding at its rear, usually with back access so that farm animals didn't have to be taken through the house -hence Back Lane.

The historical core of the settlement is a Conservation area.

Two housing estates of the latter half of the 20th century more than doubled the size of the settlement. They are Bearcroft, north of Gadbridge Road which is the eastern continuation of the High Street, and Burtonwood which is east of Hereford Road. A small industrial estate, the Whitehill Business Park, was set up on the Kington Road.

History

Early days
A detailed archaeological survey of the site of the castle in 2002, using ground-penetrating radar, gave indications of an Iron Age settlement here.

There are a few Roman surface finds. A coin of Constantine the Great was found in the town in the 17th century. In 2001, two brooches and six coins were found close to The Ley.

Saxons
The settlement existed in Saxon times, as evidenced from its entry in the Domesday Book. In 1066, the village was owned by “Edwy the Noble’’ and had ten villagers, five smallholders, eleven slaves, one priest and two “other”. It was valued at £5, and was in the Hundred of Stretford.

In the Domesday Book the village name was transcribed as Wibelai. The name possibly derives from 'Wibba's Ley', a ley being a woodland glade and Wibba being a local Saxon landowner. It is still pronounced as "Web-ley" (the spelling being similar to nearby Leominster which also does not pronounce the letter 'o' in its name).

Whether the Saxon settlement was nucleated and, if so, where it was located, are both uncertain although Bell Square is suggested and possible house platforms identified. Also uncertain is the location of the place of worship served by the priest mentioned in the Domesday Book, as the earliest extant fabric in the present church is Norman.

Two hints exist as regards the status of the Saxon place of worship. One is that the later church had the same dedication as the nearby great minster of Leominster, that of SS Peter and Paul. However, there is no documentation to support the claim that Weobley was a dependent chapel in the original area of the Leominster parochia according to the Minster hypothesis. The other is that the Domesday survey listed a priest but not the church or chapel; since the survey was of landholdings producing an income, this hints that the church had no independent revenue and so was not yet parochial.

Church
The parish church is the oldest surviving building in Weobley.

The Domesday book listed the Lord of the Manor in 1086 as Roger de Lacy. The de Lacy family was to become very powerful. Hugh de Lacy became Lord of the Manor in 1091, and he is credited with building the forerunner of the present church early in the next century -the Norman south doorway of this survives, albeit salvaged and re-set in a later wall.

Hugh gave his new church to his family's monastic foundation of Llanthony Priory, which established a cell (a small dependent monastery) here. However, it did not last long. The priory retained possession until the Dissolution.

The putative aisleless Norman church was re-built in an extended project which continued through most of the 13th century. This began at the start of this century, when a south aisle was added (the Norman doorway was preserved from the demolished wall, and re-used). The chancel was rebuilt about mid-century, and then the nave was reconstructed -this was only completed in the early 14th century. The work included the addition of a narrow north aisle and a clerestory; the latter involved the replacement of the south aisle arcade, only about seventy years old. The bell-tower was added to the north-west corner around 1330–40, with a spire that is the second-tallest in the county. This tower is at an angle, which is unusual, and is thought to have doubled up as a fortified peel tower against Welsh raids. Finally, the north aisle was widened in the mid 15th century in the Perpendicular style, and a large east window provided for the chancel.

Castle

The castle ruins comprise a ring and bailey -there is no motte, and no surviving stonework. However, the Garnstone deer-park contains a large flat-topped mound that has been identified as a motte -although there is doubt about this. If the identification is correct, then the first castle was not on the present site.

Weobley Castle is only first documented as existing during The Anarchy, when it was seized in person by King Stephen from Geoffrey Talbot in 1140, although it was still the property of the de Lacy family. Later, that family's involvement with the rebellion against King John by William de Braose, 4th Lord of Bramber  led to the castle being in royal possession again from 1208 to 1213. A surviving depiction by Silas Taylor, executed in 1655, shows the ruin of a rectangular keep with round corner towers, and the style suggests that the castle was rebuilt by Walter II de Lacy after the de Lacy family regained ownership. However, there was no further active history and John Leland described it in 1535 as “a goodly castell, but somewhat in decay”.

A geophysical survey in 2003 revealed that the bailey had fallen out of use in the 12th century, when or soon after the stone keep had been built, and had been subdivided into burgage tenements as part of the town.  However, all these had been replaced by ridge and furrow cultivation by the 17th century as the town underwent redevelopment and the smallholding portions of burgage tenements were hived off. The final removal of all stonework from the site is undocumented, but was thorough as even the foundations were dug out.

Mediaeval borough
The 2003 geophysical survey mentioned above demonstrated archaeologically that the town existed by the 13th century, and was experiencing growth. However, it never had a royal market charter which indicates that the market right was already of time immemorial in the Middle Ages. The first market was possibly at Bell Square, and if so was moved when Walter II de Lacy laid out Broad Street as a borough with flanking burgage tenements on both sides, also a single set of tenements on the west side of the present Hereford Road which took over the old castle bailey. The market day was Thursday. The new settlement was also provided with defences which were, at best, a timber palisade on a bank and ditch. This did not last long, and did not morph into a proper town wall.

Walter II did obtain a charter for an annual fair in 1231, but this was to transfer the date from the Feast of the Ascension to that of the Invention of the Holy Cross (3 May) so the origin of the fair is also unknown.

At this period there was a stack of two watermills exploiting the limited power of the little Marl Brook, one on the site of the 19th century steam mill and the other upstream. Later, windmill was built on a little hill now called “Windmill Knapp”, just west of Back Lane, by the start of the 15th century. The same location had been occupied by a pottery in the 13th century, and the site is now a Scheduled Ancient Monument.

The 1255 eyre roll for Herefordshire listed Weobley as having its own jury for legal trials at the circuit court. In 1295 the town briefly became a parliamentary borough when King Edward I summoned two representatives to London, who attended parliaments until 1307. Then representation lapsed.

There was a small Jewish community here in the late 13th century, which meant that the town was prospering commercially. It was noted for trade in particularly high-quality wool known as “Leominster Ore”. It also developed a fine leather glove industry, which was flourishing by the end of the 16th century. However, in the late Middle Ages the town was most famous for its ale -as distinct from beer, as it was not hopped. A local proverb, “Leominster bread and Weobley beer, none can come near” was first recorded in Camden's Britannia in 1610. The Welsh were very fond of ‘’cwrw Weble’’ or Weobley ale, and it features in late mediaeval Welsh poetry.

The triangular marketplace was infilled in the 14th century owing to building pressure, as the range of buildings that used to be in the surviving one between Broad Street and Portland Street (all now destroyed) allegedly contained some fabric of that age. However, the original infill consisted of two parallel rows separated by three narrow streets. The easternmost street and the eastern row were both lost in 17th century redevelopment, but the step in the eastern Broad Street frontage is the ghost of the latter. Six high-quality timber-framed buildings of the 14th century in the town survived to be listed in the 20th century.

Parliamentary borough

In 1628 Weobley was incorporated as a borough, sending two Members of Parliament to the House of Commons until the Reform Act 1832. The voting requirement specified that the “inhabitant householders” had the vote. The borough constables maintained a record of eligible voters, called the “lewn book”. Predictably the borough elections quickly became known for corruption, venality and arguments about validity, with some voters being persuaded by the supply of free drink -so that one candidate called Weobley “our liquid metropolis”.

The ancient parish of Weobley was divided into two townships, those of “Weobley Borough” and “Weobley Foreign”. There was no municipal corporation (town council), so the lord of the manor was in charge of the town and the annual court leet (as distinct from the circuit court, which was for more serious legal matters). At the court leet, two constables were elected for law enforcement purposes, and they also supervised parliamentary elections. There were no other town officials, so administratively the place was no better than a village.

In the contemporary village is “The Throne”, a large 400-year-old building - King Charles I spent the night here on 5 September 1645, after the Battle of Naseby during the English Civil War. Back then the edifice was the “Unicorn Inn”, but that business moved across the street to new premises later in the century and the former hostelry was renamed in honour of the visit.

The Market Hall (demolished in the 1860s)  was a fine timber-framed building allegedly erected by John Abel (1578-1675), and located on the south-east corner of the marketplace infill. It has a large upper chamber over an open ground floor, supported by ornately carved timber posts. A drawing of it survives by Joseph Murray Ince 1839, which is now at the Rhode Island School of Design Museum in the USA. Also, paintings by William Pitt of the mid 19th century feature it.

William Crowther, a native who made his fortune as a haberdasher in London, left a legacy to found a Free Grammar School for local boys in 1653. A timber-framed edifice was provided on the west side of Hereford Street (now Hereford Road), and the school was opened in 1655. The building survives as the “Old Grammar School”. In the early 18th century a charity school for girls also existed.

John Birch, a soldier and politician who fought for the Parliamentarian cause in the First English Civil War, sat in the House of Commons at various times from 1646. He purchased the Garnstone estate and became the Lord of the Manor, having himself elected as a Member of Parliament in 1679. He remained as such until his death in 1691, and has an impressive monument in the parish church. His nephew, also called John Birch, then became Lord of the Manor and was also a borough MP when he died in 1735.

There are several surviving 17th century town buildings, evidence of prosperity. Also, the burgage tenements were being broken up, and many of their smallholdings were being hived off and consolidated as farm fields. This occurred on the castle site.

The confusion, venality and corruption occurring at elections (votes were being sold for £10-15 each; £2275-3300 in 2021 values) drew the attention of Parliament, and in 1736 it was resolved to restrict the franchise to occupiers (owners, or tenants having been resident for 40 days previously) of so-called “vote houses”. The annual rental value of such a property had to be £1 or over, and the occupier had to pay scot and lot which, in practice, meant the parish poor rate since there was no borough corporation. However, after this the Lord of the Manor, Thomas Thynne, Viscount Weymouth (later first Marquess of Bath) instructed the constables not to register for the poor rate any resident who would not promise to vote for his candidates. This was disfranchisement, and the aggrieved voters took their case to the King's Bench. They lost, and thus Weobley became a pocket borough under the control of the Thynne family. To make sure of matters, Weymouth bought the vote houses that he didn't already own.

In 1830, a House of Commons report gave the number of vote houses in 1821 as 93, but with only 81 occupiers. Allegedly the Marquess had been keeping vote houses empty until forty days before an election, when he would have temporary tenants installed who would vote obediently.

19th century
The manufacture of gloves at Weobley received a boost at the start of the 19th century during the Napoleonic Wars, because imports of fine French gloves were stopped. At this time, the town was still famous for beer (“malt liquor”, so it was not hopped). Quarries of building stone and roadstone were in the vicinity”. There was a direct turnpike road to Hereford, the present Hereford Road. At this time, the ancient fair on 3 May had been replaced by one on Maundy Thursday for “horned cattle” (i.e. not calves) and horses, and also on the Thursday three weeks later for the same and “coarse linen cloth”.

In 1807 the castellated mansion of Garnstone Castle was built by John Nash.

The parliamentary borough was disfranchised by the Reform Act 1832. Since there was no town council, administratively the place became a village. Despite this it was chosen as the headquarters of the local poor law union, and a workhouse was opened at Whitehill on the road to Kington in 1837. A Roman Catholic church was opened in 1834, and a Primitive Methodist congregation gathered in 1839 and built a chapel in 1844 (the present structure opened in 1861). To supplement the old Grammar School, the National Society for Promoting Religious Education opened a National School in 1834.

However, the town continued to morph into a village in the 1840s. John Thynne had become the fourth Marquess of Bath in 1837 aged only six, and his trustees of his estate decided to dispose of the “vote houses” by auction in 1844 and 1846. They also ordered the disposal of the Market Hall in 1848, which was the death-knell for the ancient market. The actual demolition of the Hall was in the 1860s.  The old grammar school gave up, sold off its building and merged with the National School to create a co-educational school in new premises in Broad Street, later to move to an extant building in Portland Street in 1873. The population of the parish in 1841 was 907.

By 1858, the fair had been moved back near to its ancient date, on 8 May for cattle 
and entertainment -it was becoming a funfair. The industries 
producing gloves and beer had both gone, the latter being replaced by cider, 
 and the only industry left was some 
malting (there was no mill yet). On the other hand, there was a new brick-built police 
station and courtroom in Back Lane and petty sessions were held every 
other Monday. A “van” (covered wagon) made the round trip to Hereford twice a week. The 
population in 1851 was 972.

The railways completely ignored Weobley.

The only 19th century industrial development was a corn mill powered by steam, completed in 1862. The parish church was restored in 1865, at a cost of £3 200 (2021: £416 000). In 1868, the market was “nearly obsolete”, but the place still regarded itself as a town and there was a town crier employed in 1877. A nail manufacturer was operating in the same year 

The extinction of street trading meant a wave of houses being converted to shops, which are a feature of the village's architecture. Some merely had shop fronts inserted,  while others suffered more radical remodelling.

Weobley Rural District Council was created in 1894, and had its offices in the Union Workhouse on the Kington road.

20th century
In 1909 the population was 703, down from 907 in 1841. The cattle fair on 8 May was defunct (the funfair continued), and the nail manufacturer had gone. At a time when motor buses were already running in Hereford (the first was in 1908), the public cart was still clopping on the round trip to Hereford twice a week. Unusually the carter was a lady, Mrs Elizabeth Garbutt.

In that year, the decayed town had a police station, a solicitor who also acted as a bank agent and insurance broker (there was no bank here yet), another insurance broker, a “relieving officer” (in charge of poverty assistance) who was also a third such broker, a doctor, six grocers, three butchers, a baker, a chemist, a tobacconist, three inns (Unicorn, Salutation and Red Lion), three drapers (clothes and material shops), a tailor, three shoemakers, a cobbler (footwear repairer), a saddler who also dealt in bicycles and who ran the post office, two hauliers, a mason, three builders and a blacksmith. There was a set of “Recreation Rooms”. The newly established Army Reserve (then known as the Territorial Force) had a Drill Hall. Lloyds Bank later opened a branch in the village, on the corner of Broad Street and High Street.

The two world wars passed Weobley by, except that eighteen local men died in action in the first one. There were no casualties in the second.

In 1920, the Birmingham and Midland Omnibus Company, familiarly known as Midland Red, began a motor bus service to Hereford. The company and its successors (which kept the original nickname) operated until the depot in Hereford shut down in 2015.

In 1943 a serious fire in a bakery gutted the remaining old buildings of the marketplace infill, and these had to be demolished to create the little town park (the “Rose Garden”) there now. The lost timber-framed block of two houses had its origin in the late 15th century, with alterations in the following three centuries.

Garnstone Castle by John Nash was demolished in 1959, the village's second major architectural loss of the 20th century.

In 1951, the population was 634 which was less than a century before. However, in 2001 the population had almost doubled to 1246 as a result of residential developments. These mostly involved the creation of the housing estates of Burtonwood and Bearcroft to the east of the historical area. The former is a council house estate built in the Fifties and early Sixties by Weobley Rural District Council, the latter was a private development from the early Seventies to the early Eighties.

21st century

In 2001 the artist Walenty Pytel completed a metal sculpture of a magpie called Magnus for the village (a magpie is the village's emblem, because it is black-and-white like many of the old houses). The sculpture was commissioned after the village won the Calor Gas/Daily Telegraph Great Britain Village of the Year in 1999.

In 2015 one of Weobley's three ancient inns, the Red Lion, closed down and became an Indian restaurant.

On 3 August 2016, the BBC's The One Show was broadcast entirely from Weobley.

In 2017 the parish church was put on the Heritage at Risk Register compiled by Historic England, because the stonework of the tower and spire was rotting and there was no restoration proposal in place.

In 2019 the village's ancient brewing industry was revived when the Weobley Brewing Company set up a brewhouse in Portland Street.

In 2021 an endowment allowed the creation of a nature reserve, named the Weobley Wildlife Meadows and run by the Herefordshire Wildlife Trust.

Governance
Weobley has never had a municipal corporation or town council. Before 1894, the parish vestry was in charge of routine civic administration, and the Lord of the Manor was in charge of the annual manorial court leet which elected two constables for law enforcement purposes. This was the same as for any parochial village in England. Then the Local Government Act 1894 created Weobley Parish Council under Weobley Rural District Council, the latter in turn being subject to Herefordshire County Council.

Weobley Rural District Council was absorbed into Leominster District Council in 1974, which in turn was abolished in 1998 to leave Herefordshire Council as a unitary authority. The Parish Council has an advisory role, and is responsible for certain public amenities. The population of the civil parish in 2011 was 1,255.

For parliamentary elections, Weobley is part of the electoral ward called Golden Cross and Weobley. The population of this ward taken at the 2011 census was 2,985.

Transport

Rail
Weobley has never had a railway. The nearest station at Moorhampton was closed in 1962. The railhead since then has been Hereford, connected by the 461 bus.

Road
Weobley's link to the wider world is the B4230, which runs from Whitehill on the A4112 through the village to Moorhampton on the A480 and then to Byrford Common on the A438. The old turnpike road direct to Hereford is a country lane. Gadbridge Road (the continuation eastwards of the High Street) and a street off Hereford Road called Burton Wood both exit the village eastwards to a network of narrow country lanes leading to Dilwyn, Stretford and King's Pyon as well as to the satellite hamlet of Weobley Marsh.

Buses

The major bus route serving the village is the 461, operated by Sargents Brothers and with a daily service in 2021 of eleven buses each way from Hereford railway station to Kington. Some of these run through to Llandrindod Wells. The main bus stop in Weobley is in Broad Street. One each way of these buses is numbered 462, because it reaches Kington via Eardisley instead of directly.

The other route is the 507, operated by Lugg Valley Travel and giving a round trip to Leominster on Tuesdays and Fridays only. Unlike the 461, this serves Burtonwood as well as Broad Street.

Places of Worship

Anglican

Overview

The village has an Anglican church, which is mostly 13th century but was restored in 1865: St Peter and St Paul's Church. This is now (2021) part of the “Weobley and Staunton Group of Parishes”, which is a team ministry including six other local churches and which is in the Diocese of Hereford.

Plan
The church has a nave with aisles of four bays, followed by a crossing with transepts. However, the transept arches are integral with the nave arcades and the nave roof is extended over the crossing. A vestry abuts this on the north side. The south aisle has an external porch. An oversized tower with spire is attached at an angle to the north-west corner of the north aisle, and intrudes into it.

Exterior
The present building replaced an earlier Norman one, and has a re-set Norman south doorway within the porch. It is not entirely certain that this came from a building on the same site; also, nothing is known of the small monastery of Augustinian canons from Llanthony Priory which briefly existed at the start of the 12th century. The extant fabric is otherwise mostly 13th century, and is made up of local sandstone ashlars and rubble. The north aisle walls and east window are, however, of the mid 15th century and are in the Perpendicular style. The roofing is partly in matching stone slabs, and partly in slate. The nave has a low clerestory, and before the 1865 restoration cat-slide roof pitches covered nave and aisles in single slopes so hiding the clerestory.

The west front of the nave is all in ashlar stonework, in contrast with the rubble used elsewhere, and dates to around 1300. The doorway is embellished with two orders of ball flower, and above is a large four-light window in the Decorated Gothic style flanked by a pair of empty statue niches. The smaller window in the end of the north aisle, to the left, is in the Perpendicular style of about 1450 and was installed inside-out by mistake.

There are four other large windows in the main body of the church, and the fenestration is otherwise simple and rather sparse. The south transept has a hexagonal rose window of seven lights. The east wall has a five-light Perpendicular window with simple tracery and a pair of portrait busts as hood moulding stops (these are of the 1865 restoration). The north transept has a two-light window topped by a trefoil, and the north aisle has a four-light Perpendicular window of more ornate design than the east window.

The large south porch has a sundial over its portal. The actual door is decorated, and is dated 1712.

Tower

The oversized five-storey tower is very unusual. On the plan it is at an angle, which is odd and not easily explicable, and is thought to have doubled up as a fortified peel tower against Welsh raids. This is because the entrance doorway (off the north aisle) was fitted with a drawbar to enable people to barricade themselves inside.

The walls are blank, grim and virtually windowless, and each face is flanked with projecting wall strips meeting at diagonal stepped buttresses at the corners. The first storey has a recess containing blind three-light window tracery in its north, west and east walls -only the central light of these is glazed. The flanking lights used to contain small statues. The top of the tower has a set of four gabled and crocketed pinnacles apparently modelled on those of the tower of Hereford Cathedral. The south face has a clock.

The octagonal stone spire is not fully original, for it was struck by lightning in 1640 and rebuilt at a shorter height in 1675. It was only restored to its original form in 1898. It is supported by four flying buttresses, a feature unique in the country, and has the bell-chamber in its base which is also a singular feature.

Interior

The mediaeval interior was vandalized by Puritan fanatics, who smashed the stained glass (some fragments survive), broke the piscina basins and mutilated the tomb effigies. The ambience mostly dates from the 1865 restoration, and has the whitewashed walls and octagonal arcade columns contrasting with the Victorian polychrome geometric tiled floor. The nave has a scissor truss roof. The Victorian stained glass is of good quality.

Some mediaeval sculptural work survives in the fabric. The south aisle at its west end has a row of corbels for a former 16th roof above the arcade, carved to depict a lion, an angel, an ape and a grotesque man. There is a late 13th century piscina in the chancel and one from earlier in that century in the south aisle; the latter is richly ornamented with dog-tooth.

The font is early 14th century, octagonal in limestone with window-tracery panels in shallow relief on each side of the bowl. The cover is c. 1700. Adjacent is one of the church's six bells, removed to here in 1983 because of worries about the tower's integrity. (These problems have become serious, leading to the church being put on the Heritage at Risk Register in 2017.) In the north transept is a fragment of the mediaeval wooden rood screen.

There are three mediaeval altar-tombs. That of Sir William Devereux (d. 1402) is against the south wall of the chancel, and has a badly defaced alabaster reclining effigy of him in armour c. 1430. He had married Agnes Crophull, heiress of Weobley Castle, and as a widow she married John Marbury (d. 1437). Their effigies, again in alabaster and mutilated with him in armour, are on their own tomb in an arched recess in the south side of the chancel, c. 1450. This tomb incorporates salvaged items from earlier work, notably two fragments of 13th century coffin lids with foliated crosses. In the north aisle is an anonymous tomb with no effigy, probably early 15th century.

In the south aisle is a tomb-slab is a tomb-slab carved with a foliated cross flaked by a mitre and crozier, with the inscription “Hic jacet Hugo Bssop”. This is a rebus, as the deceased was not a bishop but had the surname Bishop.

On the chancel north wall is the spectacular Baroque monument commemorating Colonel John Birch (d. 1691). It has a pair of black marble Corinthian columns, standing on a high shallow plinth bearing his epitaph which is framed in the same marble. The columns support the ends of a broken segmental pediment, and in the gap of this is his heraldry carved in relief. The aedicule frames a statue of the deceased within a shallow round-headed niche in grey marble.

Churchyard cross

In the churchyard just south of the chancel are the remains of a 14th-century churchyard cross, which comprise a Scheduled Ancient Monument. This has five octagonal steps, and a decorated socket stone. The shaft and cross-head are modern.

There is a legend that if you walk around the cross seven times at midnight while reciting the Lord's Prayer backwards, you will summon the Devil.

War Memorial

The village's war memorial is further south in the churchyard, and is a Grade II Listed 
Building. The material used is sandstone, and it was inaugurated in 1920. It is a cross with a 
tapering shaft, standing on a monolithic block with partly chamfered corners, itself standing 
on a stepped plinth. The names commemorated are carved into the block; there are eighteen 
from the First World War, and none from the Second World War because the village suffered 
no casualties -this is mentioned in the epigraph.

Roman Catholic

Weobley's little Roman Catholic church is on the Kington Road outside the village, and is dedicated to St Thomas of Hereford.

When being a Catholic was illegal in England under the Penal Laws, Weobley was described as a “nest of Papists”. The recusant Monington family of Sarnesfield Court (demolished 1955) maintained a chapel in their house after the Reformation until Catholic emancipation in 1829, whereupon they decided to have a church built. It was erected in 1835, and is the oldest Roman Catholic church in Herefordshire as well as being a very early example of ecclesiastical Gothic Revival architecture.

The family put the church under the care of Downside Abbey, and several other local Catholic churches were founded from it. However, in 1923 the responsibility was transferred to the local Belmont Abbey, and in 1938 it was decided to consolidate the three churches at Weobley, Broxwood and Kington into the one parish of “Kington and Weobley”. Belmont Abbey is still in charge, and the parish priest resides at Weobley. The church of the Holy Family at Broxwood has been closed down and is now a private house; this was built in 1863, in an isolated and thinly populated location in the civil parish of Pembridge.

The church at Weobley is a very simple rectangular goth-box in sandstone rubble with a slate roof, having three bays and with a large two-light Gothic window for each bay in the south wall. These windows have brick headings, and wooden tracery. A similar but smaller west window is over the small gabled external porch (added in the 20th century), and on the roof gable above is a simple bell-cote. The north wall is windowless, and abuts a small red brick annexe which is now the sacristy but used to be a schoolroom. The east end of the church abuts the presbytery, which is an attractive two-storey Regency-style house (higher than the church) in bright red brick with a symmetrical frontage and a floating semi-cylindrical door canopy over a fanlight. The ensemble is Grade II listed, as one building.

The small interior has pink walls and a shallowly vaulted white plaster ceiling. The wooden altar, reredos and statues of the Sacred Heart and St Thomas of Hereford are by the Hereford woodcarver Charles Victor Gertner. The angels in front of the supports of the west gallery are salvage from Belmont Abbey church.

Methodist
A Primitive Methodist congregation gathered at Weobley in 1839, and built a chapel in 1844. This they rebuilt, and the present structure opened in 1861. The chapel is now (2021) part of the Shropshire and Marches Methodist Circuit.

This is a small rectangular edifice in red brick, with two large round-headed windows in each side wall separated by shallow brick pilasters. Ancillary accommodation abuts the back. The façade has a pair of windows in the same style, flanking a round-headed doorway with fanlight. The windows and the doorway are lined with ashlar stone blocks in long-and-short work, and the building's corners are provided with rectangular quoins set so as to give the same effect. The keystones of the doorway and windows of the façade are each embellished with an axe-head motif in sunk relief. There is a stone string course creating a false pediment. A stone dedicatory tablet with a shallowly rounded top sits on this string course.

Schools

The village has two schools, Weobley High School and Weobley Primary School. They are situated next to each other on the south side of the street called Burton Wood.

The primary school has its antecedents in a Free Grammar School for local boys in 1653, founded as a result of a legacy left by Willian Crowther in 1863. This existed in a surviving timber-framed building in Hereford Road until it merged with a National School founded for both sexes in 1834. The combined school established itself in premises in Portland Street in 1873, now the village's convenience store.

Weobley High School was built in response to the growth in the size of the village in the later 20th century, and opened in 1963 as Weobley County Secondary School.
New premises were built for the primary school just to the east of this, and opened in 1998. These feature a pioneering “environmentally friendly” system of heating, powered by a boiler fuelled with wood chips and having wall insulation made from recycled newspapers. The system also serves the High School next door, with the latter's old oil-fired system being kept in reserve.

Sport

Bowls
Bowls has a long history in Weobley. There was a bowling green on the site of the 
castle in 1824, but the present Weobley and District Bowling Club (which plays flat green) was founded in 1947. The first green was on Church Road, behind the (now closed down) Red Lion inn. The club moved to its present green on Hereford Road in 2010.

Football
Weobley Football Club was founded in 1990, and played in the Herefordshire Football League. It was wound up in September 2019 owing to the amateur playing squad having commitment issues.

Cricket
Weobley Cricket Club amalgamated with the Burghill and Tillington Cricket Club in 2016; the resultant Burghill, Tillington and Weobley Cricket Club play in the Worcestershire County Cricket League at their ground at Tillington.

Public Amenities

The Village Hall is on Gadbridge Road, and next to it is the Play Area which has a skatepark. The Community Centre is a separate facility in Burton Gardens. The Weobley Museum and History Centre is in the former police station on Back Lane.

The village has a Medical Centre at the start of Gadbridge Road, comprising a surgery and a dentists. The Post Office is on Portland Street. Lloyds Bank on the corner of Broad Street and High Street has closed down.

In 2021 there were also two long-established inns (The Unicorn and The Salutation), two restaurants (one used to be the former Red Lion inn), a tearoom, a convenience store (the Old School Shop, because the village school used to be here), a butchers, a delicatessen with café and a very small traditional filling station (Portland Garage).

A Heritage Trail has been laid out in the village, and there is also a Weobley Circular Walk which takes in the countryside to the south.

Listed Buildings

Scheduled Monuments
Weobley has three Scheduled Ancient Monuments: 
The castle earthworks.
The mediaeval pottery on Windmill Knapp (nothing to see).
The churchyard cross.

Grade I

Weobley has two Grade I Listed Buildings: 
The parish church of SS Peter and Paul.
The Ley. The latter is a farmhouse to the west of the village, and is a sumptuous two-storey timber-framed house on a H-plan, built in 1589 and little altered since.

Grade II*
Weobley has eleven buildings listed Grade II*, two-storey black-and-white timber box-framed unless otherwise specified:

Grade II
Weobley has seventy-six buildings listed Grade II. Some of these are on farms outside the village:

Gallery

References

External links

Weobley Parish Council
Official Website for Weobley, Herefordshire
Photos of Weobley and surrounding area on Geograph
Remains of castle
St Peter and St Paul church, Weobley
Weobley Conservation Area Appraisal 2006
The Heritage Trail leaflet
The Weobley Circular Walk leaflet

Villages in Herefordshire
Civil parishes in Herefordshire